De La Salle College may refer to:

Australia

New South Wales
 De La Salle College Ashfield, New South Wales
 De La Salle College, Orange, NSW, closed in 1977
 De La Salle College, Cronulla, a southern suburb of Sydney, NSW
 De La Salle College, Revesby Heights in the south-west of Sydney, NSW
 O'Connor Catholic College in Armidale, New South Wales, Australia, formerly De La Salle College Armidale

Other states
 De La Salle College, Malvern, Victoria
Southern Cross Catholic College in Redcliffe, Queensland, formerly De La Salle College, Redcliffe

Ireland
 De La Salle College Ballyshannon, County Donegal, Ireland
 De La Salle College Waterford, County Waterford, Ireland
 De La Salle College Churchtown, Dublin, Ireland
 De La Salle College Dundalk, County Louth, Ireland

Philippines
 De La Salle–College of Saint Benilde, Manila, Philippines

United Kingdom
 De La Salle College, Jersey, St Saviour, Jersey
 De La Salle College of Higher Education, former name of Hopwood Hall College, Middleton, England, UK
 De La Salle College, Belfast, Northern Ireland
 De La Salle College, Salford, former name of Pendleton College in Salford, England, UK

Other countries

 De La Salle College (Toronto), Ontario, Canada
 De La Salle Frere, Amman, Jordan
 De La Salle College (Malta), Cottonera, Malta
 De La Salle College, Mangere East, Auckland, New Zealand
 De La Salle College, Colombo, Sri Lanka

See also 
 Lasallian educational institutions
 De La Salle Brothers Philippine District, part of the Institute of the Brothers of the Christian Schools
 De La Salle Philippines, a network of schools
 De La Salle Academy (disambiguation)
 La Salle High School (disambiguation)
 De La Salle High School (disambiguation)
 De La Salle (disambiguation)
 La Salle (disambiguation)
 La Salle University (disambiguation)